J. Horn may refer to:

 Jakob Horn, German mathematician
 J. Horn (Cambridgeshire cricketer), English cricketer